Alfred Beattie Littell (July 1, 1893 – December 12, 1970) was an American Republican Party politician who served as a member of both houses of the New Jersey Legislature and as President of the New Jersey State Senate in 1951. He was the father of State Senator Robert Littell and grandfather of Assemblywoman Alison Littell McHose.

Biography
Littell was born in 1893 in Bethlehem, Pennsylvania. He attended Lawrenceville School and then entered Princeton University. His studies were interrupted by the entry of the United States into World War I. He enlisted on December 14, 1917, in the 3rd Field Artillery Regiment. He was discharged on August 11, 1919, with the rank of battalion sergeant major. He completed his studies at Princeton and graduated in 1920. Littell represented Sussex County in the New Jersey General Assembly in 1922 and again from 1940 to 1943. He then served in the New Jersey Senate from 1943 to 1953. In 1951 he became Senate President. After retiring from the Senate, he served as Sussex County Freeholder in 1956 and as Mayor of Franklin, New Jersey from 1956 to 1957. In 1970, Littell died at the age of 77 in Guadalaraja, Mexico while on vacation with his wife Dorothy.

Family
On October 17, 1927, Littell married Dorothy A. Kershner, daughter of Eugene K. and Claribel (Waters) Kershner. They had five children: Nancy Ann, Richard Watson, Philip Beattie, Sally Vincent, and Robert Eugene. Robert Littell (born January 9, 1936) went on to serve in the Assembly from 1968 to 1990 and in the State Senate from 1990 to 2008. Littell's granddaughter Alison Littell McHose served in the Assembly from 2003 to 2015, representing the 24th legislative district.

References

External links

Alfred B. Littell at The Political Graveyard

1893 births
1970 deaths
Politicians from Bethlehem, Pennsylvania
People from Franklin, New Jersey
Lawrenceville School alumni
Princeton University alumni
United States Army personnel of World War I
Republican Party members of the New Jersey General Assembly
Republican Party New Jersey state senators
Presidents of the New Jersey Senate
Mayors of places in New Jersey
County commissioners in New Jersey
20th-century American politicians